Trey Palmer (born April 2, 2001) is an American football wide receiver for the Nebraska Cornhuskers. He previously played for the LSU Tigers. On November 26th, 2022, Palmer announced on Twitter that he will be leaving the Huskers and entering the NFL Draft.

High school career
Palmer attended Kentwood High Magnet School in Kentwood, Louisiana. He played wide receiver and safety in high school. He committed to Louisiana State University (LSU) to play college football.

College career
Palmer played at LSU from 2019 to 2021. In three years he had 41 receptions for 458 yards and three touchdowns over 28 games. Prior to 2022, he transferred to the University of Nebraska–Lincoln. He took over as Nebraska's number one receiver his first year with the team.

References

External links
Nebraska Cornhuskers bio
LSU Tigers bio

2001 births
Living people
Players of American football from Louisiana
American football wide receivers
LSU Tigers football players
Nebraska Cornhuskers football players